Chiari is a surname. Notable people with the surname include:

Fabrizio Chiari (1621–1695), Italian painter and engraver
Hans Chiari (1851−1916), Austrian pathologist
Giuseppe Bartolomeo Chiari (1654–1727), Italian painter
Isidoro Chiari (1495–1555), one of the fathers of the Council of Trent and a translator of the Bible
Johann Baptist Chiari (1817–1854), Austrian gynecologist and obstetrician, father of Hans and Ottokar Chiari
Mario Chiari (1909–1989), Italian production designer and art director
Nick Chiari (born 1993), American music producer
Ottokar Chiari (1853–1918), Austrian laryngologist and professor at the University of Vienna
Pietro Chiari (1712–1785), Italian playwright, novelist and librettist
Rodolfo Chiari (1869–1937), Panamanian politician
Walter Chiari (1924–1991), stage name of Italian actor Walter Annichiarico